Adolph Ignatievich Rosner, known professionally as Ady Rosner and Eddie Rosner (26 May 1910 – 8 August 1976) was a Polish and Soviet jazz trumpeter sometimes called "The White Louis Armstrong" or "Polish Louis Armstrong". He was a prisoner in the Gulag when Joseph Stalin was General Secretary of the Communist Party of the Soviet Union.

Biography

Early years
Rosner was born into a Jewish family in Berlin. When he was six years old, he attended Stern Conservatory. He studied classical music but developed a fondness for jazz. At 20, he left the conservatory as a violinist to enter the High School of Music on the Kantstrasse near the Opera.

Career
Using the name "Eddie", Rosner began playing trumpet with Polish musicians who had been members of the Marek Weber orchestra. In the 1930s he joined the Syncopators, becoming Eddie Rosner and the Syncopators when the band went on tour in Europe and performed on the steam ship New York during trips between Hamburg and New York City. He recorded with the band and wrote letters to Gene Krupa, hoping to establish a career in America. After the Nazi Party was elected in Germany, he concluded he couldn't return home, so he applied for residence in Belgium but was rejected.

Rosner moved to Poland and started a nightclub, then married a Polish singer, Ruth Kaminska. After the Nazis invaded Poland in 1939, Rosner and his wife moved to Białystok in western Belarus, which was taken over by the Soviet Union. He started a big band which became known at State Jazz Orchestra of the Belorussian Republic. With the approval of Joseph Stalin, the band toured the Soviet Union during World War II, entertaining troops and party members as The State Jazz Orchestra of the USSR or the Soviet State Jazz Orchestra. Rosner was paid well, receiving up to 100,000 rubles a year.

After the war, he was arrested by the Soviet MGB in the city of Lviv in Ukraine as he was trying to cross the border with his family, charged with conspiracy and insulting the fatherland. He was sent to a Gulag prison camp in Far East with a ten-year sentence. For the next eight years he continued to perform in the Gulag near Magadan and was allowed to play music to lift the spirits of other prisoners. The leader of the camp had heard Rosner's music and enjoyed it, so he allowed Rosner to form a band to entertain prisoners, guards, and Soviet officials throughout the gulag system. Rosner was released in 1954, more than a year after Stalin's death.

Comeback
In the mid-1950s, Rosner founded and led a Russian big band that toured the Soviet Union and made several recordings from 1954 until 1971. In 1956 he and his jazz band were filmed in the Soviet comedy The Carnival Night, gaining further popularity among movie fans. Soviet press and critics were instructed to avoid mentioning him in publications and critical works. Authorities restricted him from performing in major concert halls in the Soviet Union.

By the early 1970s Rosner suffered from poor health. Sensing that the end was near, he applied to Soviet authorities for permission to immigrate to his birthplace and was allowed to return to his native Berlin in 1973. He did not earn any royalties in the Soviet Union and died in poverty three years later.

A documentary about him, The Jazzman from the Gulag (Le Jazzman Du Goulag) by Pierre-Henry Salfati, won an arts documentary prize at the BBC Emmy Awards.

References

External links
Soviet discography

1910 births
1976 deaths
20th-century German male musicians
20th-century German musicians
20th-century trumpeters
German jazz trumpeters
Jewish musicians
German male jazz musicians
Male trumpeters
Musicians from Berlin
20th-century German Jews